The Summit is a rural town and locality in the Southern Downs Region, Queensland, Australia.

The locality borders New South Wales.

Geography 
The Summit is predominantly farmland with some urban development surrounding the railway station. The New England Highway passes north-south through the town, running close to and parallel with the Southern railway line. Originally the highway was the main street of the town, but now the highway bypasses the town to the east. Cannon Creek forms the south-western border of the locality.

History 

The town takes its name from The Summit railway station, which was so named because it was the highest point on the Southern railway line from Warwick to Wallangarra.

The Summit State School opened on 29 August 1921.

The Summit Methodist Church opened on Wednesday 18 August 1915. Following the amalgamation of the Methodist Church into the Uniting Church in Australia in 1977, it became The Summit Uniting Church. It closed on 18 November 2017. It was at 9 Church Road. The church building is still extant, but has been converted into a house.

On Sunday 28 November 1926, St John's Anglican Church was officially opened and dedicated by Reverend Canon David Garland.

The Seventh-Day Adventist Church opened in 1989.

Education

The Summit State School is a government primary (Prep-6) school for boys and girls at Taggart's Road. In 2018, the school had an enrolment of 31 students with 3 teachers (2 full-time equivalent) and 7 non-teaching staff (3 full-time equivalent).

There is no secondary school in The Summit. The nearest government secondary school is Stanthorpe State High School in Stanthorpe to the south.

Amenities

The Summit Public Hall is at 101 Granite Belt Drive opposite the railway station.

St John's Anglican Church is at 7 Teale Road. It is part of the Stanthorpe Parish within the Anglican Diocese of Brisbane.

The Summit Seventh Day Adventist Church is at 25 Church Road.

References

Further reading

External links

 
 Town map of The Summit, 1977

Towns in Queensland
Southern Downs Region
Localities in Queensland